Gábor Jaross (born 3 February 1979) is a Hungarian former professional tennis player.

Born in Budapest, Jaross was a national indoor champion and made a Davis Cup appearance for Hungary against South Africa in 2002, losing his singles rubber to Wesley Moodie. He also played collegiate tennis in the United States for Hawaii Pacific University, where he achieved All-American honors. In 2003 he was a Hungarian representative at the 2003 Summer Universiade, held in Daegu.

See also
List of Hungary Davis Cup team representatives

References

External links
 
 
 

1979 births
Living people
Hungarian male tennis players
Tennis players from Budapest
Hawaii Pacific Sharks
College men's tennis players in the United States